In mathematical analysis, the smoothness of a function is a property measured by the number of continuous derivatives it has over some domain, called differentiability class. At the very minimum, a function could be considered smooth if it is differentiable everywhere (hence continuous). At the other end, it might also possess derivatives of all orders in its domain, in which case it is said to be infinitely differentiable and referred to as a C-infinity function (or  function).

Differentiability classes
Differentiability class is a classification of functions according to the properties of their derivatives. It is a measure of the highest order of derivative that exists and is continuous for a function.

Let k be a non-negative integer.

To put it differently, the class  consists of all continuous functions. The class  consists of all differentiable functions whose derivative is continuous; such functions are called continuously differentiable. Thus, a  function is exactly a function whose derivative exists and is of class . The class  of infinitely differentiable functions, is the intersection of the classes  as  varies over the non-negative integers.

Examples

Example: Continuous (C0) But Not Differentiable 

The function

Example: Finitely-times Differentiable (C) 
For each even integer , the function

is continuous and  times differentiable at all . At , however,  is not  times differentiable, so  is of class C, but not of class C where .

Example: Differentiable But Not Continuously Differentiable (not C1)
The function

is differentiable, with derivative

Because  oscillates as  → 0,  is not continuous at zero. Therefore,  is differentiable but not of class C1.

Example: Differentiable But Not Lipschitz Continuous 
The function

is differentiable but its derivative is unbounded on a compact set. Therefore,  is an example of a function  that is differentiable but not locally Lipschitz continuous.

Example: Analytic (C) 
The exponential function  is analytic, and hence falls into the class Cω.

Example: Smooth (C) but not Analytic (C) 
The bump function

The function  is an example of a smooth function with compact support.

Multivariate differentiability classes

exist and are continuous, for every  non-negative integers, such that , and every . Functions of class  are also said to be continuously differentiable.

The space of Ck functions
Let  be an open subset of the real line.

The set of  functions over  also forms a Fréchet space. One uses the same seminorms as above, except that  is allowed to range over all non-negative integer values.

The above spaces occur naturally in applications where functions having derivatives of certain orders are necessary; however, particularly in the study of partial differential equations, it can sometimes be more fruitful to work instead with the Sobolev spaces.

Continuity

The terms parametric continuity (Ck) and geometric continuity (Gn) were introduced by Brian Barsky, to show that the smoothness of a curve could be measured by removing restrictions on the speed, with which the parameter traces out the curve.

Parametric continuity
Parametric continuity (Ck) is a concept applied to parametric curves, which describes the smoothness of the parameter's value with distance along the curve.

As a practical application of this concept, a curve describing the motion of an object with a parameter of time must have C1 continuity and its first derivative is differentiable—for the object to have finite acceleration. For smoother motion, such as that of a camera's path while making a film, higher orders of parametric continuity are required.

Order of parametric continuity

The various order of parametric continuity can be described as follows:
 : zeroth derivative is continuous (curves are continuous)
 : zeroth and first derivatives are continuous
 : zeroth, first and second derivatives are continuous
 : 0-th through -th derivatives are continuous

Geometric continuity

The concept of geometrical continuity or geometric continuity (Gn) was primarily applied to the conic sections (and related shapes) by mathematicians such as Leibniz, Kepler, and Poncelet. The concept was an early attempt at describing, through geometry rather than algebra, the concept of continuity as expressed through a parametric function.

The basic idea behind geometric continuity was that the five conic sections were really five different versions of the same shape. An ellipse tends to a circle as the eccentricity approaches zero, or to a parabola as it approaches one; and a hyperbola tends to a parabola as the eccentricity drops toward one; it can also tend to intersecting lines. Thus, there was continuity between the conic sections. These ideas led to other concepts of continuity. For instance, if a circle and a straight line were two expressions of the same shape, perhaps a line could be thought of as a circle of infinite radius.

Order of geometric continuity
A curve or surface can be described as having  continuity, with  being the increasing measure of smoothness. Consider the segments either side of a point on a curve:

: The curves touch at the join point.
: The curves also share a common tangent direction at the join point.
: The curves also share a common center of curvature at the join point.

In general,  continuity exists if the curves can be reparameterized to have  (parametric) continuity. A reparametrization of the curve is geometrically identical to the original; only the parameter is affected.

While it may be obvious that a curve would require  continuity to appear smooth, for good aesthetics, such as those aspired to in architecture and sports car design, higher levels of geometric continuity are required. For example, reflections in a car body will not appear smooth unless the body has  continuity.

A  (with ninety degree circular arcs at the four corners) has  continuity, but does not have  continuity. If an editable curve with  continuity is required, then cubic splines are typically chosen; these curves are frequently used in industrial design.

Other concepts

Relation to analyticity
While all analytic functions are "smooth" (i.e. have all derivatives continuous) on the set on which they are analytic, examples such as bump functions (mentioned above) show that the converse is not true for functions on the reals: there exist smooth real functions that are not analytic. Simple examples of functions that are smooth but not analytic at any point can be made by means of Fourier series; another example is the Fabius function. Although it might seem that such functions are the exception rather than the rule, it turns out that the analytic functions are scattered very thinly among the smooth ones; more rigorously, the analytic functions form a meagre subset of the smooth functions. Furthermore, for every open subset A of the real line, there exist smooth functions that are analytic on A and nowhere else .

It is useful to compare the situation to that of the ubiquity of transcendental numbers on the real line. Both on the real line and the set of smooth functions, the examples we come up with at first thought (algebraic/rational numbers and analytic functions) are far better behaved than the majority of cases: the transcendental numbers and nowhere analytic functions have full measure (their complements are meagre).

The situation thus described is in marked contrast to complex differentiable functions. If a complex function is differentiable just once on an open set, it is both infinitely differentiable and analytic on that set .

Smooth partitions of unity
Smooth functions with given closed support are used in the construction of smooth partitions of unity (see partition of unity and topology glossary); these are essential in the study of smooth manifolds, for example to show that Riemannian metrics can be defined globally starting from their local existence. A simple case is that of a bump function on the real line, that is, a smooth function f that takes the value 0 outside an interval [a,b] and such that

From what has just been said, partitions of unity don't apply to holomorphic functions; their different behavior relative to existence and analytic continuation is one of the roots of sheaf theory. In contrast, sheaves of smooth functions tend not to carry much topological information.

Smooth functions on and between manifolds
Smoothness can be checked with respect to any chart of the atlas that contains  since the smoothness requirements on the transition functions between charts ensure that if  is smooth near  in one chart it will be smooth near  in any other chart.

Preimages and pushforwards along smooth functions are, in general, not manifolds without additional assumptions.  Preimages of regular points (that is, if the differential does not vanish on the preimage) are manifolds; this is the preimage theorem.  Similarly, pushforwards along embeddings are manifolds.

Smooth functions between subsets of manifolds

There is a corresponding notion of smooth map for arbitrary subsets of manifolds.

See also
 
 
 
 
 
 
 
  (number theory)
 
 
 Sobolev mapping

References

Smooth functions